Henry Braham (born 30 October 1965 in England) is a British cinematographer, best known for his work on Nanny McPhee, The Legend of Tarzan, Guardians of the Galaxy Vol. 2 and The Suicide Squad.

Early life and career
Braham’s cinematographic career began in 1989 with the British band The KLF working on their 1991 road movie, The White Room.

He later became a frequent collaborator with director Kirk Jones, as Cinematographer on his films Waking Ned Divine (1998), Nanny McPhee (2005) and Everybody’s Fine (2009). Braham’s other credits include The Golden Compass (2007), Bright Young Things (2003), The Legend of Tarzan (2016) and Guardians of the Galaxy Vol. 2 (2017).

Braham has also directed several commercials. In 2013, Henry has also designed the lighting for the sellout exhibition, “Hats: An Anthology by Stephen Jones” for the Victoria & Albert Museum.

Henry is a member of the British Society of Cinematographers and is also the co-founder of the Good Hemp Food brand with Glynis Murray.

Filmography
Film

Television

References

External links 

1965 births
English cinematographers
English photographers
Living people